The 1998 Gael Linn Cup, the most important representative competition for elite level participants in the women's team field sport of camogie, was won by Munster, who defeated Leinster in the final, played at St Vincents.

Arrangements
Leinster defeated Connacht 2–7 to 2–4, Munster defeated Ulster 5–19 to 2–13 and Fiona O'Driscoll, scored 3–9 as Munster defeated Leinster 6–20 to 1–11 for their fourth successive title.

Gael Linn Trophy
Ulster defeated Munster 1–13 to 1–11 at St Vincent's Grounds. Leinster defeated Connacht 3–12 to 2–8. Goals from Brenda Burke, Shauna McCaul and Leona Fay helped Ulster defeated 3–12 to 1–12 in the final.

Final stages

|}

Junior Final

|}

References

External links
 Camogie Association

1998 in camogie
1998
Cam